Adeopapposaurus (meaning "far eating lizard", in reference to its long neck) is a genus of prosauropod dinosaur from the Early Jurassic Cañón del Colorado Formation of San Juan, Argentina. It was similar to Massospondylus. Four partial skeletons with two partial skulls are known.

The type specimen, PVSJ568, includes a skull and most of a skeleton to just past the hips. The form of the bones at the tips of the upper and lower jaws suggests it had keratinous beaks. The fossils now named Adeopapposaurus were first thought to represent South American examples of Massospondylus; while this is no longer the case, Adeopapposaurus is classified as a massospondylid.  Adeopapposaurus was described in 2009 by Ricardo N. Martínez. The type species is A. mognai, referring to the Mogna locality where it was found.

Phylogeny 

The following cladogram shows the position of Adeopapposaurus within Massopoda, according to Oliver W. M. Rauhut and colleagues, 2020:

See also 

 2009 in paleontology

References 

Massospondylidae
Dinosaur genera
Early Jurassic dinosaurs of South America
Fossils of Argentina
Jurassic Argentina
Geology of San Juan Province, Argentina
Fossil taxa described in 2009